The 2009–10 WRU Challenge Cup, known for sponsorship reasons as the SWALEC Cup, was the 40th WRU Challenge Cup, the annual national rugby union cup competition of Wales. The previous competition was won by Neath RFC, who had previously won it six times, in 1971–72, 1988–89, 1989–90, 2003–04, 2007–08 and 2008-09.

Calendar

Matches

Round 1

Round 2

Round 3

Finals

Quarter-finals

Semi-finals

Final

See also
2009–10 WRU Challenge Cup: Tier 2
2009–10 WRU Challenge Cup: Tier 3

External links
WRU Challenge Cup on BBC.co.uk

WRU Challenge Cup
Challenge Cup
Wales Cup1